William Lindsay Tisch  (born 9 October 1947), known as Lindsay Tisch, is a former New Zealand National Party politician.

Early life
Tisch was born in Auckland, New Zealand, in 1947. When he was a child, his family moved to Matamata. He obtained a diploma in agriculture from Lincoln College. He has worked as a farmer and a rural valuer, and was a management consultant. He was a director of Landcorp (1991–1997) and is a member of the Institute of Directors in New Zealand and the New Zealand Institute of Property Management.

Tisch is a Justice of the Peace, a trustee of the Pohlen Hospital Foundation based in Matamata, and a member of Matamata Lions Clubs.

Member of Parliament

He joined the National Party in 1966, and has held a number of senior roles in its organisational wing. In 1994 he served briefly as the party's president and was the party's campaign manager for the 1996 election. He was a member of Parliament from 1999 to 2017, when he retired.

He defeated the Labour candidate by 5,000 votes. The name referred to a little-known river past Morrinsville, and Tisch was successful in lobbying to have the electorate renamed after the Waikato River.

In the 2008 election, Tisch was re-elected in the recreated Waikato seat with a majority of 12,850 over Jacinda Ardern. He was further re-elected in the 2011 election and 2014 election, after which he retired.

In 2009, it was revealed Tisch was using a front company to maximise his accommodation allowance paid by the taxpayer. Tisch was claiming $410 a week which was paid to his property investment company, Heritage 653 Limited.

Tisch was never a minister but held senior parliamentary roles in the National Party and in the House of Representatives. He was the National Party junior whip (2002–2005) and senior whip (2005–2006) before taking on roles as Deputy Speaker of the House (2008–2011) and Assistant Speaker of the House (2011–2017). Under former leaders Bill English and Don Brash, Tisch was briefly National Party spokesperson for small business (2002–2005), civil defence and emergency services (2003–2004), and internal affairs (2003–2005).

Political views 
Tisch held conservative views and opposed same-sex marriage law reform. In 2004, Tisch voted against the Civil Union Act 2004, a bill making it legal for those in same-sex as well as heterosexual relationships to enter into a civil-union. In 2005, Tisch voted for Gordon Copeland's Marriage (Gender Clarification) Amendment Bill, a bill which would have amended the Marriage Act to define marriage as only between a man and woman. In 2012 and 2013, Tisch voted against the Marriage (Definition of Marriage) Amendment Bill, a bill allowing same-sex couples to marry in New Zealand.

Honours
Tisch was one of the 3,632 recipients of the New Zealand 1990 Commemoration Medal, which he received for services to the public.

In the 2018 New Year Honours, Tisch was appointed a Companion of the Queen's Service Order for services as a Member of Parliament. In the 2020 New Year Honours, his wife, Leonie, was awarded the Queen's Service Medal, for services to health and the community.

References

|-

|-

|-

1947 births
Living people
Companions of the Queen's Service Order
New Zealand National Party MPs
New Zealand MPs for North Island electorates
Unsuccessful candidates in the 1996 New Zealand general election
People from Matamata
Members of the New Zealand House of Representatives
People from Auckland
Lincoln University (New Zealand) alumni
21st-century New Zealand politicians